Kusekeyevo (Küsäkäy) is a rural locality (a selo) in Chekmagushevsky District, Bashkortostan, Russia. The population was 349 as of 2010. There are 3 streets.

Geography 
Kusekeyevo is located 22 km south of Chekmagush (the district's administrative centre) by road. Kyzyl-Yulduz is the nearest rural locality.

References 

Rural localities in Chekmagushevsky District